Jouko Ahola (born December 1, 1970) is a Finnish former strongman, powerlifter and actor. He is a two time World's Strongest Man winner, a two time Europe's Strongest Man winner, and is regarded as one of the best pound for pound strongmen in history.

Strongman
Jouko is best known for winning both the 1997 and 1999 World's Strongest Man, and finishing second in 1998. Ahola also won the Europe's Strongest Man contest twice, in 1998 and 1999, and finished fourth in 1996. Jouko won the World's Strongest Team in 1997 and 1999, and was second in 1998.

Ahola set world records for the Hercules hold (45.7 sec, 197 kg) and Atlas Stones (215 kg).

He is one of only ten men to be a repeat champion in the World's Strongest Man competition.

Jouko was a very successful strongman competitor, at 6' 1" (1.85 m) and 275 lbs (125 kg), corresponding to a BMI of 35.8, which is low by WSM standards.

Personal Records

Bench press -  raw
Squat -  raw
Deadlift -  raw

Acting career
After his strongman career, Ahola has directed his focus towards films. So far, his most notable roles have been in Kingdom of Heaven, Bad Day to Go Fishing, War of the Dead and Invincible.

Ahola starred in Werner Herzog's 2001 film Invincible as early 20th century Jewish strongman Zishe Breitbart. Jouko played a former world wrestling champion in Alvaro Brechner's 2009 film Bad day to go fishing, (Mal día para pescar). The film premiered at Cannes Film Festival.

Jouko appeared in the music video for Robin's "Faija skitsoo" in 2012. He also made a cameo appearance on the second season of The Dudesons TV series, which aired worldwide in 2008.

Jouko also serves as a judge and event organizer for the World's Strongest Man contest.

In 2013 he appears in the new History Channel series Vikings.

Filmography

Miscellaneous
 He regards Arnold Schwarzenegger as his role model.
 His nickname is "Jokke."
 His name is often misspelled as Juoko Ahola, Finnish for "Does Ahola drink?"

References

External links 
 
 
 Interview 1997
 Interview 1999

1970 births
Living people
People from Hämeenlinna
Finnish male film actors
Finnish strength athletes
Finnish powerlifters